Red Clay Consolidated School District (abbreviated Red Clay or RCCSD) is a public school district in northern New Castle County, Delaware. Founded in 1981, Red Clay serves a portion of the city of Wilmington, as well as its northwestern suburbs.

Its service area includes Elsmere, Greenville, Hockessin, Newport, northwestern Wilmington, most of Pike Creek, most of Pike Creek Valley, and half of North Star.

Its headquarters are in the Austin D. Baltz Elementary School partially in Elsmere and partially in an unincorporated area; it has a Wilmington postal address.

History
The state of Delaware modified its school districts, and due to that it was established on July 1, 1981.

Schools
 6-12 schools
Cab Calloway School of the Arts (Wilmington)
Conrad Schools of Science (unincorporated area)
John Dickinson High School (unincorporated area)

High schools
Alexis I. duPont High School (Greenville, unincorporated area)
Thomas McKean High School (unincorporated area)

High Schools Chartered by Red Clay District
Charter School of Wilmington 
Delaware Military Academy

Middle schools
Alexis I. duPont Middle School (unincorporated area) 
Henry B. duPont Middle School (Hockessin)
Skyline Middle School (Pike Creek Valley, unincorporated area)
Stanton Middle School (unincorporated area)

Elementary schools
Anna P. Mote Elementary School (K-5)
Austin D. Baltz Elementary School (K-5)
Brandywine Springs School (K-8)
Evan G. Shortlidge Academy (K-2)
Forest Oak Elementary School (K-5)
Heritage Elementary School (K-5)
Highlands Elementary School (K-5)
Linden Hill Elementary School (K-5)
Marbrook Elementary School (K-5)
North Star Elementary School (K-5)
Richardson Park Elementary School (K-5)
Donald J. Richey Elementary School (K-5)
Warner Elementary School (3-5)
William C. Lewis Dual Language Elementary School (K-5)
William Cooke, Jr. Elementary School (K-5)

Pre-elementary schools
Red Clay Early Years Program (ages 3–4)

Special schools
First State School (for students grades 2–12 with medical needs)
James H. Groves Adult High School (night classes for adult learners)
Meadowood Program (transition program for students ages 3–21)

LGBTQ+ policies
The Red Clay Consolidated School district has caused debate by allowing students to enter the bathroom, locker room and participate in sports as the gender they identify as at school. Per policy 8005 A, "Information about a student's transgender status, legal name, or gender assigned at birth may
constitute confidential information. School personnel shall not disclose information that may
reveal a student's transgender status or gender diverse presentation to others, including other
students, and other school personnel, unless legally required to do so or unless the student has
authorized such disclosure."

Teachers are required to address each student by the gender they say they are. Per policy 8005 D, "A student has the right to be addressed by a name and pronoun that corresponds to the student's gender identity as asserted at school. A court-ordered name or gender change is not required, and
the student need not change their official records."

Per policy 8005 F, "... A transgender or gender diverse student shall have the
right to access the restroom that corresponds to the student’s gender identity consistently
asserted at school."

Transgender students have the right to use the locker room that corresponds with their gender identity under policy 8005 G "A transgender or gender diverse student shall have access to the locker room that corresponds to the student’s gender identity consistently
asserted at school... A transgender or gender diverse student shall not be
required to use a locker room that conflicts with the student’s gender identity consistently
asserted at school."

Transgender students have the right to participate in sports teams that correspond with their gender identity per policy 8005 I "A transgender or gender diverse student shall be permitted to participate in interscholastic
athletics in a manner consistent with the student’s gender identity as asserted at school and
when the student meets the minimum standards designated by the Delaware Interscholastic
Athletic Association (DIAA) Board of Directors (Reference: Delaware Regulations: Administrative
Code: Title 143 : 1000, 1099 DIAA High School Interscholastic Athletics, 5.1.4.1)."

Some see these policies as a benefit for transgender rights while others view these as a violation of the modesty and potential safety of children.

Former schools
 Wilmington High School

References

External links
 Red Clay Consolidated School District website

Education in Wilmington, Delaware
School districts established in 1981
School districts in New Castle County, Delaware
1981 establishments in Delaware